Wide Awake is an unincorporated community in Berkeley County, South Carolina, United States. The community is located northeast of Summerville, along U.S. Route 17 Alternate. The community name was established around the early 1900s; however, the origin of the name comes from two possible expressions: The first describing the area as being wide awake politically, the second being regardless of the time of day or night, someone is wide awake to what their neighbors are doing.

References

Unincorporated communities in Berkeley County, South Carolina
Unincorporated communities in South Carolina
Charleston–North Charleston–Summerville metropolitan area